Waiting for the Roar is the third studio album by the British heavy metal band Fastway. It was recorded at Abbey Road Studios in 1985 and released in 1986.

Track listing

Personnel
Fastway
Dave King - lead vocals
'Fast' Eddie Clarke - rhythm/lead guitar
Shane Carroll - rhythm guitar
Paul Reid - bass guitar
Alan Connor - drums

Additional musicians
Terry Manning - synthesizers, backing vocals
Carl Marsh - Fairlight programming and orchestration
London Studio Orchestra
Chris Thompson - additional backing vocals

Production
Terry Manning - producer, engineer, mixing at Mayfair Studios, London
Paul Mortimer, Noel Rafferty - assistant engineers
Simon Sullivan - mixing assistant

References 

1986 albums
Albums produced by Terry Manning
Fastway (band) albums
Columbia Records albums